Shohruh Yuldashev (born 29 may 1985), most commonly known by her stage name Shohruhxon, is an Uzbek singer. The singer was awarded "Nihol" in 2008 and "Etirof" state awards in 2017.

Shohruhxon achieved great success in the field of acting. Shohruhxon gained widespread recognition and recognition in Uzbekistan after starring in the 2006 Uzbek drama Romeo and Juliet. Since then, he has starred in many Uzbek comedy films. In particular, the films "Yarim Baht", which was released on the big screens in 2007, and "Boʻrilar" brought the actress great popularity.

Biography 
Shohruh Yoldoshev was born in 1985 in the city of Tashkent in the family of actor Alisher Yoldoshev and Zebo Navrozhva. 2003 After graduating from high school, he entered the Tashkent State Theater and Art Institute. He graduated in 2007 and continues to expand his creative activity.

Family 
Shohruhxon was in love with Asal Shodieva, a famous actress from Uzbekistan, for several years, and Shohruhxon and Asal Shodieva got married in 2016.
 Dad: Alisher Yuldashev
 Mother: Zebo Navrozova
 Brother: Shuxrat Yuldashev
 Brother: Muhammad Ali Navruzov
 Spouse: Asal Shodiyeva

Children 

 Child: Muhammad Yusuf Yuldashev
 Child: Baxtiyor Yuldashev

Career

Singer career 
Shohruhxon began her singing career in 2004. Shohruhxon released her first songs in 2006. His first songs were "sms", "Higorim", "Sensiz", "Senda eat kalbim" and "Fashion". During his creative activity from 2010 to 2022, Shokhruhon released many songs including "Gulylolam", "Chorla", "Mening Koshygim", "Zoʻrsan", "Yiglar Osmon", "Shoshma", "Kogyrchok", "Zvezdy", " Komila", "Paryzod", "Aldamadim", "Yoningdaman", "Jonim dadam", "Yurak", "Gulym", "Telba", "Unamadi" y "Oddy bola", "Kino" They have gained great popularity among the young people.

Acting career 
Durante este tiempo, protagonizó varias películas. He also started acting in 2006. Despite starring roles in Romeo and Juliet, Half of Happiness, and Sumalaku's Woe, she received positive reviews for her debut role. Then the singer starred in several more films, including in April 2007 in April-May. In 2007, he starred in the film "Wolves" This film brought Shohruhxon great popularity and fans. In 2008, he starred in the film "Wolves 2". This movie will bring Hondanda even more fame and fortune. In 2009, he starred in the film "City Elevator." 2010 "No to Hell, Dad!" (Tahir and Zuhra 2 Reinterpretation) will appear in a small role in Missing and this year will appear in Missing. He also starred in the 2013 films Yorkie and Sen ketma.

In the media 
Shohruhxon has also been a part of several popular store lists. He was included in the list of the 10 most desirable people in Uzbekistan in 2009 and 2010 by Bella Terra Uzbekistan magazine. UzDaily named him one of the 5 Most Powerful Male Singers and the Most Popular Singers in 2012 and 2013 respectively. In 2012, Darkchi magazine included it in the list of "Most Favorite Men's Room". In 2018, he was included in the list of "The Best Central Asian Singers".

Concert

Video clips

Filmography 
Below, in chronological order, is an ordered list of movies Shohruhxon appeared in.

Awards and nominations

State awards 

 Shohruxon has received many awards. Most notably "Nihol" which is an Uzbek award given to recognize excellence of professionals in the music and film industries. The singer was awarded the "Nihol State Prize" in 2008.

 2017 "(Recognition)Etirof" state award.
 Uzbekistan's 30-year independence award

References

External links 

 
 ShohruhxonKinopoisk

1985 births
Actors from Tashkent
Living people
Uzbekistani male film actors